Bauhinia forficata, commonly known as Brazilian orchid tree, pata-de-vaca,, pezuña de vaca is a species of flowering tree in the pea family, Fabaceae, that is native to Argentina, Brazil, Uruguay and Peru.

References

External links
 
 
 Its entry in the tropical plant database
 Research identifying useful chemical extracted from Pata de vaca

forficata
Trees of Brazil
Trees of Peru